Brigg railway station serves the town of Brigg in North Lincolnshire, England. It was built by the Great Grimsby and Sheffield Junction Railway (GG&SJR) and opened on 1 November 1848. The GG&SJR subsequently became part of the Manchester, Sheffield and Lincolnshire Railway main line between Grimsby and Manchester Piccadilly. It is managed by Northern Trains, who also operate all passenger trains serving it. The station is unstaffed and the only buildings are the bus shelters standing on the platforms now for cover. In 2016, the footbridge was replaced, with the 1880s structure acquired by the Wensleydale Railway and installed at Leyburn.

Services 
All services at Brigg are operated by Northern Trains.

Weekday services have not called here since October 1993, when British Rail withdrew them at the end of the summer timetable.

References

External links 

Brigg
Railway stations in the Borough of North Lincolnshire
DfT Category F2 stations
Former Great Central Railway stations
Railway stations in Great Britain opened in 1848
Northern franchise railway stations